Orry may refer to:

People
Jean Orry (1652–1719), French economist and financial and governmental reformer
Philibert Orry (1689–1747), French statesman, count of Vignory and lord of La Chapelle-Godefroy
Orry-Kelly (1897–1964), the professional name of Orry George Kelly, a prolific Hollywood costume designer
Peter Orry Larsen (born 1989), Norwegian footballer

Other uses
Orry-la-Ville, town in northern France
SS King Orry (1946), the lead ship of the King Orry class of passenger ferries and packet ships built for the Isle of Man Steam Packet

See also
 King Orry (disambiguation)
 Ori (disambiguation)
 Ory (disambiguation)